Tmesisternus pulvereus is a species of beetle in the family Cerambycidae. It was described by Francis Polkinghorne Pascoe in 1867. It is known from Papua New Guinea.

References

pulvereus
Beetles described in 1867